Sherline is a machine tool builder founded in Australia and currently headquartered in Vista, California, USA. It builds miniature machine tools (microlathes and micromills) and a wide range of tooling to be used on them. Within the miniature segment of the machine tool industry, Sherline is one of the most widely known brands. According to Sherline, their line of OEM accessories (chucks, vises, rotary tables, and so on) is more comprehensive than that of any other builder of machine tools, regardless of machine size.

Sherline tools are often used by hobbyists for making nearly any kind of part that can be machined, as long as it fits within a miniature machine tool's limits of slide travel. Sherline's products are also used by industry. They provide an inexpensive way to build custom tooling using modular components (XY tables, machine slides, etc.).

Sherline's sales are global. Its product line helps to put machine tools in places where traditionally they would be unlikely to go by lowering the threshold for market entry. Its turnkey CNC systems are some of the least expensive CNC machine tools on the market, making it possible for individual hobbyists to enter a market that in past decades was almost entirely industrial.

References

Bibliography

 . Originally published in 1998; content updated with each print run, similar to a "revised edition". Currently in the fourth print run.

External links
 Sherline's official site

Machine tool builders
Vista, California
Companies based in San Diego County, California